Moshe Selecter is an Israeli former footballer who played in Maccabi Haifa.

Honours

Player

Club
Maccabi Haifa
Israeli Premier League: 1983–84, 1984–85
Maccabi Acre
Liga Alef: 1989-90

Individual
Footballer of the Year – Israel: 1984-85

References

Living people
Israeli footballers
Maccabi Haifa F.C. players
1961 births
Association football forwards
Israel international footballers
Beitar Jerusalem F.C. players
Hapoel Kfar Saba F.C. players
Maccabi Acre F.C. players
Israeli Footballer of the Year recipients